Thermonatrite is a naturally occurring evaporite mineral form of sodium carbonate, Na2CO3·H2O.

It was first described in 1845. Its name is from the Greek θερμός thermos, "heat", plus natron, because it may be a dehydration product of natron.

Typical occurrence is in dry saline lake beds and as soil encrustations. It has been reported from volcanic fumaroles and in association with carbonatite-related veins. Common associated minerals include trona, natron and halite.

See also 
 Nahcolite
 Natron
 Niter 
 Potassium nitrate
 Shortite
 Soda (disambiguation)
 Sodium sesquicarbonate
 Trona

References

Carbonate minerals
Orthorhombic minerals
Minerals in space group 29